The genus  Orius (commonly called minute pirate bug) consists of omnivorous bugs in the family Anthocoridae (pirate bugs).  Adults are 2–5 mm long and feed mostly on smaller insects, larva and eggs, such as spider mites, thrips, jumping plant lice, and white fly, but will also feed on pollen and vascular sap.

These predators are common in gardens and landscapes. They have a fairly painful bite, but are not venomous.

Some species are raised commercially and sold to growers as a form of biological control.

In laboratory conditions, the larval development of Orius niger takes 14 days at a temperature of 25°; females have a longevity of 60 days and can lay up to 150 eggs.

Species
 Orius candiope 
 Orius diespeter 
 Orius harpocrates 
 Orius insidiosus  (insidious flower bug)
 Orius minutus 
 Orius niger 
 Orius pumilio 
 Orius tantillus 
 Orius thyestes 
 Orius tristicolor

References

External links
Iowa State University Department of Entomology Iowa Insect Information Notes, minute pirate bug entry (with picture)

Anthocoridae
Cimicomorpha genera